Ordughesh Rural District is a rural district (dehestan) in the Central District of Zeberkhan County, Razavi Khorasan province, Iran. At the 2006 census, its population was 9,788, in 2,540 families.  The rural district has 18 villages.

References 

Rural Districts of Razavi Khorasan Province
Nishapur County